A gel is a complex solid but fluid substance with liquid-like properties.

Gel may also refer to:

Personal care 
 Hair gel, a gel used for setting hair styles which makes it stay still
 Shower gel, a cosmetic body wash
 Personal lubricant used for sex purposes

Pharmaceutics and physical chemistry 
 Gel cap, a gelatinous capsule in which a drug is held
 Aerogel, a gel that has been dehydrated under supercritical conditions such that the liquid has been replaced with gas
 Hydrogel or aquagel, a water-insoluble polymer
 Sol-gel, a colloidal suspension that can be gelled to form a solid
 Xerogel, a dried gel that, when heated, becomes a dense glass

Entertainment 
 Color gel, a transparent colored material used to shade stage lighting for plays and film
 Gel, a fictional character in the manga series Hunter × Hunter

Other uses 
 Gel (dessert), a dessert made with sweetened and flavored gelatin
 Gel conference
 Gel pen
Gelling (Arunachal Pradesh), location in India
 Georgian lari, by ISO 4217 currency code
 Group Exemption Letter, issued by the United States Internal Revenue Service
 Lichk, Armenia, formerly Gël
 Silica gel
 ut-Ma'in language

See also 
 
 
 Agar
 Collagen
 Colloid
 Gelatin
 Jelly (disambiguation)